Wanda Nuti (21 September 1925 – 7 August 2017) was an Italian gymnast. She competed in the women's artistic team all-around at the 1948 Summer Olympics.

References

External links
 

1925 births
2017 deaths
Italian female artistic gymnasts
Olympic gymnasts of Italy
Gymnasts at the 1948 Summer Olympics